Grant Gillespie is an English novelist, screenwriter and actor who lives in W1, London.

As an actor, he's had numerous TV and film roles. His credits include: Television - Will (TNT), Catastrophe, Siblings, the Channel 4 mocumentary Cast Offs, Hollyoaks, Holby City, Eastenders, Doctors, Casualty, Poirot Midsomer Murders; Film - Kingsman - The Golden Circle, Florence Foster Jenkins, Lecture 21; Theatre - Sir Benjamin Backbite in School for Scandal directed by Jamie Lloyd, Oswald in King Lear with Timothy West at the helm and Peter in Don Juan directed by Michael Grandage; Audio - Armadale, Tulips in Winter, Dr Who - Serpent Crest, Jorrocks, Jaunts and Jollities, and Number Ten; Computer games - Squadron 42, Dark Souls and Bloodborne.

His debut novel The Cuckoo Boy was published by London publishing house To Hell with Publishing in May 2010. The novel tells the story of an unusual boy adopted into a middle-class British family anxious to conform, with dangerous consequences. Parts of the novel were inspired by the James Bulger case. Literary charity Booktrust wrote that Grant Gillespie "writes beautifully about imagined dreamscapes and viewing the adult world with a child’s eyes."

The reviewers said:

The Guardian, Catherine Taylor ‘Enterprising new publisher To Hell With states its intent with Gillespie’s emotionally visceral debut. The spectre of Lionel Shriver’s Kevin is omnipresent, particularly in the black comedy and ambiguous aspects of the tale. Yet this is a confident, impressive work in its own right. First Novels

The Observer, Mary Fitzgerald ‘Through James and David, Gillespie explores the chasm between how children and adults perceive the world, and the devastating consequences of falling through this gap. The Cuckoo Boy is a savage indictment of hypocrisy and forced social convention.’ Debut Fiction

Irish Examiner, Dan MacCarthy ‘With strong parallels to Golding’s Lord of the Flies which demonstrated the savage nature of humanity detached from civilisation, Gillespie’s superb debut avers that such isolation is possible within our own societies and that the consequences can be tragic. In this case, the mob rules.

Inside Books, Simon Quicke ‘Very clever…this book is both relevant and provocative. It might not be comfortable reading but as a way of taking a reader on a journey, which good books should do, into the mind of a unloved and desperate child it delivers.’

Farm Lane Books Blog Review Jackie@ Farm Lane Books Blog ‘Many episodes are quite chilling. It reminded me of The Fifth Child and classic Gothic ghost stories. It’s gripping and thought provoking, but also contains many of the amusing observations that only young children can get away with. There were so many talking points that I’m sure I could spend hours discussing it – making it a perfect book club choice.’

JustWilliamsLuck.blogspot.com, William Rycroft ‘It would be easy to expect an actor to be good at writing dialogue or creating a narrative voice (in fact most actors are terrible at improvising dialogue that sounds real – never underestimate the skills of the playwright!) but Gillespie deserves genuine credit for what he achieves with all his cast and particularly with James and David.’

The Bookbag, Louise Laurie ‘Fine comic lines throughout. It is a fine piece of writing. Who is right? Who is wrong? A deeply thought-provoking book. Recommended.’

Dovegreyreader.co.uk, Lynne Hatwell ‘Grant Gillespie is a wizard, an absolute natural at dialogue and inner voice with an omniscient narrator who sifts out all those perceptive angles.’

Forbidden Planet International – Best Books of the Year, Doug Wallace ‘To Hell picked up the amazing Grant Gillespie’s debut. The unique thing about this book is that Gillespie is able to step inside the head of the main character, his mother and his father and make you really feel like he was there.’

Dovegreyreader.co.uk, Lynne Hatwell from the first of two articles: ‘A fabulous concoction of emotions and observations, lots of nature versus nurture ponderings and a razor-sharp narrative voice to die for, which all adds up to my first truly un-put-downable new novel of the year to date.’

The Booktrust, ‘This impressive debut is a parable that deconstructs the ‘perfect-family’ model with eerie tension. The spirit of Gillespie's novel lies in penetrating suburban conformities. Through a mixture of pathos, humour and sparse prose, he deconstructs the model family with care, wrestling with weighty topics like nature over nurture.’

Evie Wyld, author of After the Fire, A Still Small Voice and All The Birds Singing: ‘A dark and elegant story of childhood, The Cuckoo Boy is horrifying and disarmingly funny. A book to keep you awake at night.’

Gillespie started writing while at school winning a place on a writer's retreat with Helen Dunmore, he continued putting pen to paper while reading English Literature at The University of Glasgow. He's since worked as a radio fiction researcher for Melvyn Bragg's In Our Time, written theatre articles for Time Out, an audio guide to Soho and is a member of the critic's panel for the Susan Smith Blackburn Prize.

References

External links
 grantgillespie.com

English male television actors
21st-century English novelists
Living people
Alumni of the University of Glasgow
English male stage actors
English male novelists
21st-century English male writers
Year of birth missing (living people)